The WEW 6-Man Tag Team Championship was a championship in Frontier Martial-Arts Wrestling and later in World Entertainment Wrestling. It was active from July 1999 until February 2002 as a substitute for the FMW World Street Fight 6-Man Tag Team Championship. The final champions were Hayabusa, Tetsuhiro Kuroda and GOEMON. They were stripped of the belts on November 5, 2001 when Hayabusa sustained an injury that left him unable to defend the title. The promotion closed in February 2002. The title was later revived in Kodo Fuyuki's World Entertainment Wrestling promotion in 2002 and was used there until the promotion closed on May 5, 2004.

Title history

References

Hardcore wrestling championships
Trios wrestling tag team championships
Frontier Martial-Arts Wrestling championships